The Paulista Republican Party (PRP), sometimes translated as the Republican Party of São Paulo, was a Brazilian political party founded on April 18, 1873 during the  and sparked the first modern republican movement in Brazil.

History
Initially a band of revolutionaries supported by a local newspaper, the PRP was created by liberal professionals (lawyers, doctors, engineers etc.) and, more importantly by important rural landowners from São Paulo. The primary objective of the party was to implement a republican federation in Brazil, with a weak central government, giving a degree of autonomy to the states, which did not exist during the Imperial era.

The proclamation of the Brazilian Republic on November 15, 1889, initiated a new order of political power in Brazil, which was to be called República Velha, and the country was to be governed by presidents strongly influenced by powerful landowners. The presidents were always candidates of the PRP or of the PRM from the state of Minas Gerais, with both being supported by powerful landowners. This policy was to be nicknamed "coffee with milk politics" (política do café com leite), alluding to the fact that São Paulo state made its wealth through exporting coffee, and Minas Gerais was famous for producing milk.

With the new republican regime, the PRP was no longer a band of revolutionaries, as it was during the Empire, but an institution dedicated to a form of bureaucracy that would dictate government policy until 1930, when Getúlio Vargas assumed control and abolished the PRP and the PRM.

Electoral results

Presidential elections

Main representatives
Prudente de Morais - President of the Brazilian Republic (1894–1898)
Campos Sales - President of the Brazilian Republic (1898–1902)
Francisco de Paula Rodrigues Alves - President of the Brazilian Republic (1902–1906)
Washington Luís - President of the Brazilian Republic (1926–1930)
Júlio Prestes - President-elect of the Brazilian Republic in 1930, President of São Paulo (1927–1930)
Bernardino de Campos - President of São Paulo (1892–1896)
João Tibiriçá Piratininga
Jorge Tibiriçá Piratininga - President and Governor of São Paulo (1904–1908)
Albuquerque Lins - President of São Paulo (1908–1912)
Altino Arantes - President of São Paulo (1916–1920)
Carlos de Campos - President of São Paulo (1924–1927)

See also
 João de Sousa Campos (1813–1880)

References

First Brazilian Republic
Defunct political parties in Brazil
Political parties established in 1873
Liberal parties in Brazil
Conservative parties in Brazil
Republican parties
Coffee with milk politics
Political parties disestablished in 1937
1873 establishments in Brazil
1937 disestablishments in Brazil